The Pottsville station, also known as Union Station Intermodal Transit Center, is a transit station in Pottsville, Pennsylvania. Originally a Reading Railroad station, it currently houses bus service, the Schuylkill County Visitors Bureau, and occasional train service by the Reading Blue Mountain & Northern Railroad.

The station was originally built by the Reading Railroad, and later served the SEPTA diesel service line extending from the Norristown section of the Manayunk/Norristown Line. It shut down in 1981, when SEPTA cancelled the diesel service. After several years of effort, the county refurbished the building to serve the Schuylkill Transportation System and the visitors bureau, as well as occasional train service. In 2013, the Reading Blue Mountain and Northern Railroad began hosting further recreational train trips to the Reading Outer Station in Reading, Pennsylvania.

References

Former SEPTA Regional Rail stations
Former Reading Company stations
Railway stations closed in 1981
Former railway stations in Pennsylvania

Bus stations in Pennsylvania